"Like a Rose" is a song by British-Norwegian boy band A1. It was released on 21 February 2000 as the fourth single from their debut album, Here We Come (1999). The single peaked at  6 on the UK Singles Chart. The single was the final official single from the album; however, a follow-up promo single, "If Only", was released exclusively on 12-inch vinyl.

Track listings
UK CD1
 "Like a Rose" (Valentine Mix)
 "If Only" (Almighty club mix)
 "Everytime" (instrumental)

UK CD2
 "Like a Rose" (Heart Mix)
 "Talkin' Bout a Revolution" (live)
 "A1 Medley"

UK cassette single
 "Like a Rose" (Valentines Mix)
 "A1 Medley"

Charts

References

2000 singles
1999 songs
A1 (band) songs
Columbia Records singles
Song recordings produced by Steve Mac
Songs written by Ben Adams
Songs written by Steve Mac
Songs written by Wayne Hector